Nanutarra Station, commonly referred to as Nanutarra, is a pastoral lease that operates as a cattle station, and previously operated as a sheep station, in Western Australia.

Description

The North West Coastal Highway runs through the property and the Nanutarra Roadhouse is within the station boundary. The Ashburton River and Henry River both traverse the lease. Neighbouring properties include Globe Hill to the west, Uaroo and Glenflorrie to the south, and Boolaloo to the north and east.

History

The lease was originally used by Harry Higham as grazing land in the 1877, after he had overlanded stock to the property. He developed the homestead in 1884. In 1906 Nanutarra was carrying a flock of approximately 45,000 sheep. By 1919 the holding had grown to become one of the largest in the area.
 
Harry Higham died in 1917, after managing Nanutarra until 1902 then retiring to live in Perth. It was stocked with 8,617 sheep at the time. The Higham family retained possession of the station and the Highman brothers sold it in 1937, along with Mount Stuart Station, to the Boololoo Pastoral Company for an undisclosed price.
 
In 2005 Nanutarra was given permanent status on the Western Australian Register of Heritage Places. The station was one of the original leases in the north west and played an important role in the development of the pastoral industry in the area.

 
The station sold in 2012 along with neighbouring Uaroo Station which were being operated as one holding. The property contains 70 equipped watering points along with many permanent and semi-permanent waterholes along the creek and river systems. Both properties had been acquired by Andrew Forrest, the Chairman of Fortescue Metals Group, who also owns Minderoo Station to the north of Uaroo.

Homestead
The homestead complex is a simple example of Victorian-Georgian architecture. The main building is composed of two detached wings connected by a covered area. Some of the buildings date back to the 1880s. Most of the complex is in fair to poor condition with most areas having deteriorated as a result of moisture ingress. The buildings were said to have moderate authenticity and are similar to the homesteads at Cooya Pooya and Tambrey stations.

See also
List of ranches and stations

References

Stations (Australian agriculture)
Pastoral leases in Western Australia
Homesteads in Western Australia
1877 establishments in Australia
State Register of Heritage Places in the Shire of Ashburton